Santa Ana High School is the oldest and largest high school in Orange County, California, United States. The school was established in 1889.

Notable alumni

 Original members of the surf band The Chantays
 Barry Asher, professional bowler
 Tony Baxter former senior Vice President of Walt Disney Imagineering and lead designer of Big Thunder Mountain Railroad, Star Tours, the Indiana Jones Adventure, Splash Mountain, and Journey Into Imagination.
 Billy Bean, played major league baseball from 1987 through 1995. He tied a major league record with 4 hits in his first major league game.
 Tony Bellamy Guitarist, member of first Native American rock band Redbone, had number one hit in the 1970s "Come and Get Your Love"
 Beverly Bivens, singer with the 1960s band We Five
 Eddie Bravo, Brazilian Jiu-Jitsu athlete
 John Brinkerhoff, USMA '50, Associate Director for National Preparedness FEMA, Deputy Assistant Secretary for Reserve Affairs DoD
 Gerald P. Carr, astronaut
 Clifford "Gavvy" Cravath, six time National League baseball home run champion in the 1910s
 Isaac Curtis, football player, Cal Berkeley and NFL Cincinnati Bengals
 Clancy Edwards sprinter
 Derek Fleming, featured Soul Train Dancer 1980-1993
 James Kanno, first mayor of Fountain Valley, California
 Diane Keaton, actress
 Greg Louganis Olympic Gold Medal Diver, LGBT Activist, called "The greatest American diver in olympic history."
 Bill Medley, singer and songwriter, best known as one half of The Righteous Brothers singing duo
 Gilbert Melendez, 2-time California State All-American wrestler; professional Mixed Martial Artist; former WEC and Strikeforce Lightweight Champion, current UFC Lightweight contender
 Donn Moomaw, football player, minister
 Chuck Smith class of 1945 founder and pastor of Calvary Chapel of Costa Mesa
 Milt Smith (1919–2010), football player, UCLA Bruins and Philadelphia Eagles
 William Cameron Townsend, prominent twentieth-century American Christian missionary and founder of Wycliffe Bible Translators and Summer Institute of Linguistics (SIL International)
Marvalee Hendricks Wake, evolutionary biologist.

Footnotes

External links
Santa Ana High School website

Educational institutions established in 1889
High schools in Santa Ana, California
Public high schools in California
1889 establishments in California